Puerto Toro is a hamlet on the eastern coast of Navarino Island, Chile. Puerto Toro was founded in 1892 during the Tierra del Fuego Gold Rush by Governor of Punta Arenas Señoret. 

It belongs to the Commune of Cabo de Hornos, in Antártica Chilena Province of Magallanes y Antártica Chilena Region. Excluding research stations in Antarctica, Puerto Toro is the southernmost permanently inhabited community on the globe, and some 3,900 km (2425 miles) from the South Pole. It is the only such community on Earth that is situated below the 55th parallel south. Puerto Toro is inhabited by 36 people according to INE's 2002 census, including fishermen and their families. According to the classification of the seas of the International Hydrographic Organization it is the only Chilean locality (and port) with coasts and waters belonging to the Atlantic Ocean, defining as the limit the meridian of Cape Horn (67°16′ W) from Tierra del Fuego to the Antarctic continent.

Over a hundred years ago, Puerto Toro was one of the most important towns in the region of the Beagle Channel as a result of the Tierra del Fuego gold rush.  Once interest in exploring for gold passed, however, Puerto Toro's importance diminished. Today, Puerto Toro is known for "centolla," the prized southern king crab.

Climate
Puerto Toro is considered to be a Tundra Climate in the Köppen climate classification, despite the fact that it is surrounded by forests.

See also

Ushuaia
Puerto Williams
Villa Las Estrellas
Southernmost settlements

References

External links

Comuna de Cabo de Hornos / Commune of Cabo de Hornos official website
Official website of Puerto Williams

Cities and towns in Tierra del Fuego
Ports and harbours of Chile
Hamlets in Chile
Populated places in Antártica Chilena
Navarino Island
Populated places in the fjords and channels of Chile